The 1921 Evansville Crimson Giants season was their inaugural in the National Football League. The team finished with a 3–2 record against NFL teams, and finished in sixth place in the standings.,

Schedule

 Games in italics are against non-NFL teams.

Standings

References

Evansville Crimson Giants seasons
Evansville Crimson Giants
Evansville Crimson Giants